Bhupendra Nath Bose (13 January 1859 – 13 September 1924) was an Indian politician and President of the Indian National Congress in 1914.

Life and works
Bose was born in Radhanagar, West Bengal in 1859. He graduated from the Presidency College, Calcutta in 1880. He completed his master's degree in 1881 and his law degree in 1883. He founded the law firm B.N. Basu and Company, whose office is still located at Temple Chambers in Kolkata.

From 1904 to 1910, Bose was a member of the Bengal Legislature. During this period, he was involved in the nationalist movement. In 1905 he presided over the Bengal Provincial Conference held at Mymensingh. He joined the anti-partition agitation and campaign against British goods throughout Bengal. In 1907, and again later, he was arrested and detained by British at Calcutta for his nationalist activities. He opposed the passing of the Press Act in 1910. He became the President of the Indian National Congress in 1914.

Bose was a member and under-secretary in the Council of the Secretary of State for India from 1917 to 1923. In 1923, he was made a member of the Executive Council of the Governor of Bengal. He then became the Vice-Chancellor of the University of Calcutta.

On 15 August 1889, Bose joined a meeting at a house in Balaram Ghosh Street in Calcutta, where Mohun Bagan Sporting Club (now Mohun Bagan AC) was founded. He became first president of Mohun Bagan AC. He died in 1924, aged 65.

References and sources
References

Sources
 Bhupendra Nath Bose

1859 births
1924 deaths
Presidency University, Kolkata alumni
University of Calcutta alumni
Presidents of the Indian National Congress
Vice Chancellors of the University of Calcutta
Prisoners and detainees of British India
Politicians from Kolkata
Indian independence activists from Bengal
Indian National Congress politicians from West Bengal
19th-century Indian politicians
20th-century Indian politicians
Indian educators
19th-century Indian educators
20th-century Indian educators
Educators from West Bengal